Targanice  is a village in the administrative district of Gmina Andrychów, within Wadowice County, Lesser Poland Voivodeship, in southern Poland.

The village has a population of 3,860.

References

Targanice